Paul Severson (August 18, 1928 – May 20, 2007 ) was an American music arranger and composer who wrote some of the most recognizable commercial music of our time. While he may be best known for the Doublemint gum jingle and compositions for Marlboro, Ford, McDonald's, Kellogg's, KFC & Chicken of the Sea, his jazz work in "The Cry of Jazz" is preserved in the Library of Congress' National Film Registry and his Hal Leonard arrangements of Dixieland titles are played by people worldwide.   During his long career he received 15 Clio Awards. Severson has been called "one of the most famous arrangers/composers you've never heard of".

Early life and career
Severson, a 1946 graduate of Fargo Central High School, settled in Chicago after obtaining a master's degree in music from Northwestern University. He performed with the Chicago Symphony Orchestra and composed for a number of top advertising agencies..

Wherever he went Severson was involved in writing music. As a performer, he played trombone or keyboards with various bands and orchestras in the 1950s and 1960s, including the CBS Chicago Staff Orchestra, the Stan Kenton Orchestra and the Chicago Civic Symphony. Severson also performed with jazz musicians such as Dizzy Gillespie, Louis Armstrong, Ella Fitzgerald and Stan Getz..

Through the 1980s and 1990s Paul Severson was head of the Minnesota State University of Moorhead's music industry program .

Later career
Back in Fargo in later years Paul Severson helped found several local jazz groups, arranged compositions for the Red River Dance and Performing Co. and served as music director for Trollwood Performing Arts School. All along, he mentored, encouraged and enlightened..

Severson composed music for a number of national commercials in the early 1990s..

Bill Robinson, who headed the Mesa State Theater department from 1960 to 1988, also had an opportunity to work with Severson. Severson composed the music for the musical Princess, which Robinson produced. "He was quite a jazz man," Robinson said. "He was a very sweet man, truly a gentleman.".

Severson was a moderator and lay minister of two Unitarian Universalist fellowships in Grand Junction and in Fargo, North Dakota. His spiritual search led him to study eastern religions, Native American spirituality, science, philosophy and mysticism. After four years of study, he became a Church of Religious Science practitioner..

Death
Paul Severson died on May 20, 2007, after a long struggle with prostate cancer.

Discography 

As Sideman (trombone):

With Ralph Marterie

 1949  Sweet and Lovely- With Strings
 1951  Dance Band in Town
 1952  Dancing on the Downbeat
 1953  Pennsylvania Turnpike
 1954  Alone Together Music for Smoochin
 1955  Salute to the Aragon Ballroom
 1955  Hits That Made Him Famous

With Stan Kenton

 1953  By Request Vol. 5

With The Four Freshmen

 1953  Tenderly/I'll Be Seeing You

With Hal Kartun

 1955  WBBM Live Showmanship

With Bill Russo

 1956  The World of Alcina

With David Carroll

 1960  Solo Encores
 1960  Latin Percussion

References

External links
 The Dixieland Jazz Recordings
 The Jazz disc recordings

1929 births
2007 deaths
American music arrangers
20th-century American musicians